The G102 Astir is a single-seat glassfibre Club Class sailplane, designed by Burkhart Grob and built by Grob Aircraft. It was the first Grob-designed sailplane, with the first flight in December 1974. Grob had previously built the Schempp-Hirth Standard Cirrus under licence.

Design and development
The Astir CS [Club Standard] is of composite (fiberglass/resin) construction, has a large wing area, a T-tail and water ballast tanks in its wings. The large wing area gives good low-speed handling characteristics but its high-speed performance is inferior to other Standard Class gliders. In early versions, some of the fuselage frame was wood but this was replaced with a light alloy casting which sometimes cracked after heavy landings. The tail dolly is unusual by being a loose fit into a vertical hole and able to fall free if take-off is attempted with the dolly in place.

A slightly improved Standard Class version, the CS 77, was introduced in 1977. It has a different rudder profile and a slimmer fuselage similar to that of the Speed Astir. The Standard II and Standard III versions followed in the early 1980s, reverting to the higher-profile fuselage and with a reduced empty weight and an increased payload.

The Astir CS Jeans was similar to the CS 77, but had a fixed mainwheel and a tailskid. Its cockpit was fitted in blue denim. Later versions were the Club II and the Club III which also had fixed gear, but the Club III had a tailwheel.

The numbers built of each type were: 536 CS, 244 CS77, 248 CS Jeans, 61 Club/Standard Astir II and 152 Club/Standard Astir III. A flapped version called the G104 Speed Astir was also produced.

The latest in the Astir line is the G102 Standard Astir III, designed by Burkhart Grob and built by Grob Aircraft as a development of the original G-102.

One Astir (now residing at the Steven F. Udvar-Hazy Center), flown by Robert Harris, broke the world absolute altitude record at 49,009 ft (14,938 m) on 17 February 1986. This record lasted until 2006.

Variants
Astir CS
The original production version of the Astir, produced up to 1977 (CS = Club Standard)
Astir CS77
Production aircraft from 1977, with revised fuselage profile and other modifications
Speed Astir
The Astir with a flapped wing to comply with the FAI 15m Flapped Class, for gliding competitions
Astir CS Jeans
Astir aircraft with faired fixed undercarriage, to comply with the Club Class for gliding competitions and to provide "glass-ship" experience at lower cost.
G102 Astir
Designation introduced by Grob for the Astir series in the 1980s, with each successive improvement given the suffix I, II or III etc.
G104 Speed Astir
The Speed Astir re-designated

Specifications (Standard Astir III)

See also

References

Sailplane Directory
Hardy, M. Gliders & Sailplanes of the World. Ian Allan, 1982
Homepage of Grob Aircraft AG

1970s German sailplanes
Grob aircraft
Aircraft first flown in 1974
T-tail aircraft